Rajat Goel (born 23 January 1993) is an Indian cricketer. He made his List A debut for Uttar Pradesh in the 2018–19 Vijay Hazare Trophy on 28 September 2018.

References

External links
 

1993 births
Living people
Indian cricketers
Uttar Pradesh cricketers
Place of birth missing (living people)